HMS Mermaid was a 24-gun sixth-rate post ship of the Royal Navy, built in 1748–49, which served in the Seven Years' War.

Construction and commissioning
Mermaid was ordered on 4 February 1748, with the contract being awarded to Henry Adams, of Bucklers Hard, with the keel being laid on 2 April.  She was built to a design by the Surveyor of the Navy Joseph Allin, named Mermaid on 6 December, launched on 22 May 1749 and completed on 7 August 1749 at Portsmouth Dockyard, having cost £4,211.16.7d to build, and with a further £3,829.3.11d spent on fitting her out.

Career
Her first commander was Captain John Montagu, who commissioned her in June 1749, and sailed her to New York in August 1749. Montagu was succeeded by Captain Edward Keller in 1750, then later that year by Captain Elias Bate. On 15 September 1752, she was driven ashore in a hurricane at Charles Town, South Carolina, British America. In 1753, command was taken by Captain John Hollwall. Mermaid served this first commission in North American and Caribbean waters, and was decommissioned in July 1753. She refitted and underwent repairs over the next few months, and recommissioned in January 1754 under Captain Washington Shirley, sailing for New England in July 1754. Captain Alexander Innes took command in 1756, and was succeeded by Captain James Hackman in 1758. She bilged on a sandbank off Big Grand Cay in the Bahamas on 4 December 1759 and was abandoned as a wreck on 6 January 1760.

Notes

References
 
 Robert Gardiner, The First Frigates, Conway Maritime Press, London 1992. .
 David Lyon, The Sailing Navy List, Conway Maritime Press, London 1993. .
 Rif Winfield, British Warships in the Age of Sail, 1714 to 1792, Seaforth Publishing, London 2007. .

Post ships of the Royal Navy
1749 ships
Sixth-rate frigates of the Royal Navy
Maritime incidents in 1752
Maritime incidents in 1759
Ships built on the Beaulieu River